New Dream – previously known as The Center for a New American Dream – is a nonprofit organization with a stated mission to "empower individuals, communities, and organizations to transform the ways they consume to improve well-being for people and the planet."

Overview
The organization works with individuals and communities to "counter the commercialization of our culture, support community engagement, and conserve natural resources." New Dream believes commercialism and overconsumption have negative effects and thus seek to change social norms around consumption and consumerism and to support the movement of individuals and communities pursuing lifestyle change and community action. New Dream’s overall goal is to change behavior, attitudes, and social norms to reduce consumption, build community, and improve quality of life.

The organization states that it embraces sustainability and a celebration of non-material values. One of New Dream's stated goals is "to shift the culture from an emphasis on more to an emphasis on more of what matters." It is up to the individual to determine what matters in his or her life, but the organization offers, by way of example, more time, nature, family, community, fairness, and fun as appropriate points of emphasis over material goods. The organization's informal motto is "More Fun, Less Stuff."

Overall, New Dream strives to create a vision of life beyond overconsumption, disposable lifestyles, and perpetual marketing, and to provide the tools to help families, citizens, educators, and activists rein in consumerism in their own lives and in broader society.

Programs

New Dream's work centers on three program areas:

SoKind Registry: Through New Dream's "alternative gift registry", users can start a gift registry or wishlist that helps them focus on fun experiences, time with family and friends, and offerings of service and support for causes they care about.

Kids & Commercialism: offers practical tips for creating non-commercial environments and experiences for children—helping people make lasting change in the lives of the kids they care about.

Simplify the Holidays: encourages people to focus on "more of what matters" during the holiday season by offering creative gift ideas and simplifying tips to help people prioritize connection and joy over stress, waste, and expense.

History

With its founding in 1997, the Center for a New American Dream sparked a new and unprecedented national conversation on materialism, living in balance, and the hidden costs of a high-consumption society. The organization’s focus on the intersections between consumption, environmental degradation, and quality of life have made it truly unique among environmental and social justice organizations. The center closed September 2020.

In 2017, the Center for a New American Dream underwent a strategic restructuring and name change in order to streamline programs and better respond to the needs of a growing audience. It is now known simply as New Dream and is currently a Joint Plan of Work Partner of Virginia Organizing, a tax-exempt organization that accepts contributions on behalf of New Dream.

On September 30, 2020, New Dream released a statement saying they, as an independent non-profit organization, would be closing their doors.  They still continue to operate in conjunction with other community partners.  They were in operation for nearly 25 years.

While the group proposed that American-style consumerism and the drive to achieve the "American Dream" are largely to blame for normalizing high-consumption lifestyles, the organization's name update reflects the need to help individuals and communities around the world reduce consumerism and materialism.

References

External links
 New Dream - official website
 SoKind Registry - official alternative gift registry website
 Simplify the Holidays campaign
 Kids & Commercialism campaign

Environmental organizations based in the United States
Ethical consumerism
Consumer organizations in the United States